Ramon Irvine Yeoman (13 May 1934 – 15 March 2004), nicknamed Yogi, was a Scottish football player and manager. He made nearly 500 appearances in the Football League playing as a wing half for Northampton Town, Middlesbrough and Darlington, and managed the latter club from 1968 to 1970.

Career
Yeoman began his career with Northampton Town. He also spent five years at Middlesbrough, holding the most number of consecutive appearances (210),  until this was surpassed by Gordon Jones.

He went on to manage Darlington, where he had an excellent understanding and a special relationship with his former team-mate Alan Sproates. Yeoman was sacked by Darlington after they just missed out on promotion. He joined Sunderland as youth team coach and was part of the FA Cup win against Leeds United in the 1973 FA Cup Final.

He later became a scout for Everton and Ipswich Town.

Death
Yeoman was born in Perth but lived in Teesside until his death in 2004. Both he and his wife are buried there.

Honours

As a coach
Sunderland
 FA Cup winner: 1973

Managerial statistics

References

External links

1934 births
2004 deaths
Footballers from Perth, Scotland
Scottish footballers
Association football wing halves
Northampton Town F.C. players
Middlesbrough F.C. players
Darlington F.C. players
English Football League players
Scottish football managers
Darlington F.C. managers
English Football League managers